Safiye Sultan ("purity"; 13 October 1696 – 15 May 1778) was an Ottoman princess, daughter of Sultan Mustafa II, and half-sister of Sultans Mahmud I and Osman III of the Ottoman Empire.

Life

Birth
Safiye Sultan was born on 13 October 1696. At the time of her birth her father was traveling to Austria and part of his harem awaited him in Belgrade, while the rest remained in Edirne. Therefore Safiye could have been born in Belgrade or Edirne. Her father was the Ottoman Sultan Mustafa II, while her mother Is unknown.

In 1703 her father was deposed in favor of his younger brother Ahmed III and she, with her half-sisters, locked up in the Old Palace until her marriage.

Marriages
Safiye was betrothed at the same time as her sisters Emine Sultan and Ayşe Sultan, to the son of Merzifonlu Kara Mustafa Pasha, known as Maktulzade Ali Pasha, and Beylerbey (governor - general) of Adana at the time. The marriage took place on 6 May 1710, during the reign of her uncle Sultan Ahmed III. The wedding procession travelled only a short distance from the Imperial Gate, through Cebehane and Soğukçeşme road to the princess's palace at Demirkapı, known as "Rami Pasha’s palace", where the marriage was consummated. Soon afterwards, in June 1710, the bridegroom was sent away to Diyarbekir to serve as provincial governor. By him, Safiye had two sons and a daughter.

After Ali Pasha's death in 1723, Safiye married Mirzazade Mehmed Pasha on 1 July 1726. By him, she had a son. After Mehmed Pasha's death in 1728, she married Kara Mustafa Paşah, Grand Vizier, in 1730. After Mustafa's death in 1736, she married Ebu Bekr Pasha in 1740, during the reign of her half-brother Sultan Mahmud I. She was widowed at his death in 1759.

Issue
Safiye Sultan had three sons and a daughter. 

By her first marriage she had: 
Sultanzade Ebubekr Bey 
Sultanzade Bayezid Bey
Zahide Hanımsultan (1722 - 6 February 1790). She married Ebu Bekr Pasha's son Elhac Suleiman Bey. 

By her second marriage Safiye had:
Sultanzade Sadik Mehmed Bey (1727 - 1780).

Charities
Safiye Sultan is known to have made vakfs for Hagia Sophia, Sultan Mehmed, Sultan Bayezid and Valide Sultan mosques. In 1729, she commissioned a fountain near the Bulgurlu Mosque in Üsküdar. In 1780, two years after her death, a fountain was commissioned between Paşabahçe and Tepeköy in Bosphorus.

Death
Safiye Sultan died on 15 May 1778, and was buried outside the mausoleum of Hafsa Sultan, Yavuz Mosque, Istanbul. Her daughter, Zahide was buried beside her.

She was one of ottoman princess more long-lived.

See also
 List of Ottoman princesses

Ancestry

References

Sources
 
 
 

1696 births
1778 deaths
17th-century Ottoman princesses
18th-century Ottoman princesses